Swinging Spiketaculars was an American comedy program. The series aired on CBS with episodes airing August 1, 1960 – September 19, 1960. The series starred Spike Jones, Helen Grayco and his band The City Slickers. Bill Dana and Joyce Jameson were also part of the regular cast.

The series was the last weekly television series that starred Jones and Grayco. Jones died in 1965 of cancer.

The series was produced by Dana and directed by Robert Scheerer. Guest stars that appeared on the series were Lennie Weinrib, Steve Allen, Jack Jones, and Bud & Travis.

Episodes

Episode #1.1 – August 1, 1960
Episode #1.2 – August 8, 1960
Episode #1.3 – August 15, 1960
Episode #1.4 – August 22, 1960
Episode #1.5 – August 29, 1960
Episode #1.6 – September 5, 1960
Episode #1.7 – September 12, 1960
Impersonations – September 19, 1960

References

External links

1960 American television series debuts
1960 American television series endings
1960s American comedy-drama television series
CBS original programming
English-language television shows
American live television series